511 Building may refer to:

511 Building (Minneapolis), a colocation center located in downtown Minneapolis, Minnesota
511 Building (Portland, Oregon)
511 Federal Building, former federal post office that currently houses Department of Homeland Security offices for U.S. Citizenship and Immigration Services and U.S. Immigration and Customs Enforcement in Portland, Oregon